The Federal Mine Safety and Health Act of 1977 (Public Law 95-164) amended the Coal Mine Safety and Health Act of 1969.  It can be found in the United States Code under Title 30, Mineral Lands and Mining, Chapter 22, Mine Safety and Health.

The S. 717 legislation was passed by the 95th United States Congressional session and enacted into law by the 39th President of the United States Jimmy Carter on November 9, 1977. S. 717 was drafted largely by Mike Goldberg of the Senate Labor Committee staff and James H. Rathlesberger, the special assistant in the Office of the Secretary of the Interior who oversaw the Mine Health and Safety Administration (MESA) until the bill transferred it to the Labor Department.   

The law of the United States enacted on November 9, 1977 took effect one hundred and twenty days later.  It had been supported by the United Mine Workers, Carter Administration and others but opposed by the mining industry.

Main provisions
combination of coal, metal and non metal mines under single legislation 
retention of separate health and safety standards for coal mining
transfer of enforcement from the Department of Interior to the Department of Labor
renaming of the Mine Enforcement Safety Administration (MESA) as Mine Safety and Health Administration (MSHA)
four annual inspections of underground coal mines
two annual inspections of all surface mines
elimination of advisory standards for metal and nonmetal mines
discontinuation of state enforcement''' plans
mandating of miner training 
requirement of mine rescue teams for all underground mines
provision of increased involvement of miners and their representatives in health and safety activities

See also

 Coal mining in the United States
 List of coal mines in the United States
 Mining accident
 Occupational Safety and Health Act

References

External links
Indexed copy of Act
Overview of mine safety legislative history
US Code
Legislative history 
"Reflections" Mining History, a short 2002 documentary on the history of American coal mining safety, leading up to and including the 1977 act, produced by the United States Mine Safety and Health Administration.

1977 in law
95th United States Congress
United States federal health legislation
United States federal public land legislation
Whistleblower protection legislation
Mine safety
Coal mining law